The 2014–15 Liga ASOBAL, also named Liga ASOBAL BAUHAUS by sponsorship reasons, is the 25th season since its establishment. FC Barcelona was the defending champions. The campaign began in September 2014. The last matchday will be played in May 2015. A total of 16 teams contest the league, 14 of which had already contested in the 2013–14 season, and two of which were promoted from the División de Plata 2013–14.

Promotion and relegation 
Teams promoted from 2013–14 División de Plata
MMT Seguros Zamora
BM Benidorm

Teams relegated to 2014–15 División de Plata
Cuatro Rayas Valladolid
Bidasoa Irun

Teams

League table

Top goalscorers

See also
División de Plata de Balonmano 2014–15

References

External links
Liga ASOBAL

Liga ASOBAL seasons
1
Spa